Uncial 0238 (in the Gregory-Aland numbering), is a Greek-Coptic uncial manuscript of the New Testament. Paleographically it has been assigned to the 8th century.

Description 

The codex contains a small part of the Gospel of John 7:10-12, on one parchment leaf (9.5 cm by 7 cm). Written in one column per page, 10 lines per page, in uncial letters.

Currently it is dated by the INTF to the 8th century.

The manuscript was added to the list of the New Testament manuscripts by Kurt Aland in 1954.

Text 

The Greek text of this codex is mixed. Aland placed it in Category III.

It was published by Walter C. Till in 1939.

Location 

Currently the codex is housed at the Austrian National Library (Pap. K. 8668) in Vienna.

See also 

 List of New Testament uncials
 Coptic versions of the Bible
 Textual criticism

References

Further reading 

 W. Till, "Kleine Koptische Bibelfragmente", Biblica 20 (1939), p. 372.

Greek-Coptic diglot manuscripts of the New Testament
Greek New Testament uncials
8th-century biblical manuscripts
Biblical manuscripts of the Austrian National Library